Standings and Results for Group J of the Last 32 phase of the 2013–14 Eurocup basketball tournament.

Standings

Fixtures and results

Game 1

Game 2

Game 3

Game 4

Game 5

Game 6

2013–14 Eurocup Basketball